The women's discus throw at the 2017 Asian Athletics Championships was held on 9 July.

Results

References
Results

Discus
Discus throw at the Asian Athletics Championships